DeJuan Shontez Wheat (born October 14, 1973) is an American former professional basketball player, formerly of the NBA's Minnesota Timberwolves and Vancouver Grizzlies. He was a star at the University of Louisville from 1993 to 1997, becoming the first player in NCAA Division I history to amass career totals of at least 2,000 points, 450 assists, 300 three-point field goals and 200 steals.

Louisville's second all-time leader in three-point field goals (323), Wheat ranks second in school history in scoring (2,183 points) and third in assists (498). As a senior, he was named Honorable Mention All-America by The Associated Press, as well as Third Team All-America by the National Association of Basketball Coaches and Second Team All-America by The Sporting News. He led the Cardinals in scoring (17.3), assists (career-high 4.3), steals (career-high 1.94), three-point field goals (career-high 97) and minutes played (34.9 per game) as a senior and had 15 games with 20 or more points. He helped lead his hometown Cards to the Elite Eight in the NCAA Tournament that season.

Wheat was selected 52nd overall in the 1997 NBA Draft by the Los Angeles Lakers but was cut in the preseason. He was signed by Minnesota before the regular season began and saw limited action in 34 games, averaging 1.7 points in 4.4 minutes per game during the 1997–98 season. He signed as a free agent with Vancouver on January 29, 1999, and played in 46 of 50 games, all as a reserve, averaging 4.5 points and 2.2 assists in only 12.8 minutes per game.

Wheat retired in 2010, playing his final season in Mexico for Soles de Mexicali.

References
Check Louisville Courier-Journal 8/24/16...  Wheat is now the Head Boys Basketball Coach at Valley High School in Louisville/Valley Station.

External links
Career stats

1973 births
Living people
African-American basketball players
All-American college men's basketball players
American expatriate basketball people in Canada
American expatriate basketball people in Mexico
American expatriate basketball people in Venezuela
American men's basketball players
Ballard High School (Louisville, Kentucky) alumni
Basketball players from Louisville, Kentucky
Idaho Stampede (CBA) players
Los Angeles Lakers draft picks
Louisville Cardinals men's basketball players
Minnesota Timberwolves players
Panteras de Miranda players
Parade High School All-Americans (boys' basketball)
Point guards
Soles de Mexicali players
Vancouver Grizzlies players
21st-century African-American sportspeople
20th-century African-American sportspeople